Alice Dauphine Sombath (born 16 October 2003) is a French professional footballer who plays as a right-back for Division 1 Féminine club Lyon.

Club career
Sombath started her career as a junior in 2011 at CSOM Arcueil, before joining Paris FC. She was then recruited by Paris Saint-Germain, where she became a pillar of the U19 team, with which she won the Championnat National Féminin U19 in 2019.

In 2020, Sombath was recruited by Olympique Lyonnais along with her PSG teammate and French international Vicki Becho. This recruitment provoked the anger of the PSG sporting director, Leonardo. When she arrived at Lyon, she signed her first professional contract.

Despite her presence on the match sheet during the French Cup final a month after her arrival, Sombath remained on the bench. She played her first Division 1 matches during the 2021-2022 season, even starting for the first day.

International career
Sombath started her international career with the France Under-16 team when they won the Montaigu Tournament in 2019. She then played in the qualifiers for Euro U17 2020 and Euro U19 2022.

Honours
Paris Saint-Germain
 Championnat National Féminin U19: 2018–19

Lyon
 UEFA Women's Champions League: 2021–22
 Division 1 Féminine: 2021–22
 Coupe de France Féminine: 2019–20
 Trophée des Championnes: 2022

References

External links
 

2003 births
Living people
French women's footballers
France women's youth international footballers
Olympique Lyonnais Féminin players
People from Charenton-le-Pont
Women's association football fullbacks
Division 1 Féminine players
Footballers from Val-de-Marne
French people of Laotian descent
French sportspeople of Asian descent